Saint Benin may refer to:
Saint-Benin
Saint-Benin-d'Azy
Saint-Benin-des-Bois
Saint Benignus of Armagh, also spelled "Saint Benin"